Morgan's Run is a historical novel by Colleen McCullough published in 2000 about the life of an English prisoner driven to the first penal colonies in Australia in the 18th century. Much of the novel is set in the penal colony on Norfolk Island. It starts off with the prisoner's life in Bristol, England and describes in detail his survival of the transportation on a prison ship to Norfolk Island and how he dared to hope in the hard life of a convict.

The musical 
The book has been adapted into a musical by Colleen McCullough and composer Gavin Lockley The musical's debut was over 8 shows in the Springwood Civic Centre by the Blue Mountains Musical Society with a cast of 32, a small classical orchestra, a harpsichord, and a rock drum kit. These performances were organised in support of the Royal Flying Doctor Service and attended by the Governor of New South Wales, Her Excellency, Professor Marie Bashir AC, CVO.

Gavin Lockley worked closely with Colleen McCullough and spent most of 2010 on Norfolk Island, the penal colony to which the musical's main character Richard Morgan was sent. Lockley's previous works including The Symphony of Australia and Ballads of the Bush have sought to express the history and essence of the nation and create a distinctive national musical heritage. Whilst Ballads of the Bush sets popular Australian verse to music, and the Symphony of Australia celebrates a nation, Morgan's Run is a narrative about the founding of a nation and its character.

References

2000 Australian novels
Novels by Colleen McCullough
Historical novels
Novels set in Oceania
Norfolk Island
2011 musicals
Century (imprint) books